Hugh Edmond Ivor Gore (born 18 June 1953) is a former cricketer from Antigua who played first-class cricket from 1973 to 1980.

Gore was born in St. John's, Antigua.  A right-handed batsman and left-arm fast-medium bowler, he took 57 career first-class wickets at an average of 33.63.  He played for the Combined Islands and the Leeward Islands in the West Indies, a season for the Border Second XI and finished his career with a season at Somerset County Cricket Club in England.

References

External links
 
 

1953 births
Living people
Antigua and Barbuda cricketers
Border cricketers
Combined Islands cricketers
Leeward Islands cricketers
Somerset cricketers
Antigua and Barbuda expatriate sportspeople in England
People from St. John's, Antigua and Barbuda